Joan Ramos Monllor (born March 28, 1942) is a Spanish cartoonist, painter, engraver, sculptor and illustrator. He lives in Xàtiva (Spain) and he is characterized for an expressionist language.

Biography

Joan Ramos was born in Valencia 1942. Your participation in exhibitions and competitions took him in 1971 to be awarded a scholarship in Paris by the French government, where he acquired extensive training as a draftsman. He illustrated the Goncourt prizes (France) and the Blasco Ibáñez prizes (Spain).

Work

Influenced among others by Modigliani, Picasso, Gauguin, Joan Ramos develops a work which highlights the envelope of expressive power to the language of the limbs in his drawings, showing a lively formal art that through these deformations. It is also typically use the oil to run lines giving gifted density forms a kind of shape and a characteristic color relief.
His paintings are a reflection of their concern, their emotions, because the different jobs or series that has developed has been due to the various investigations that have led to the development from works inspired by classical iconography, African culture or historical urban cities, to portraits of relevant characters.
Ramos has received numerous awards and recognitions some internationals and other nationals from the 70s to the present.

References

MUÑOZ IBÁÑEZ, Manuel, "Joan Ramos" en La pintura valenciana del siglo XX, Fernando Doménech, 1998 

20th-century Spanish painters
20th-century Spanish male artists
Spanish male painters
21st-century Spanish painters
Spanish sculptors
Spanish male sculptors
1942 births
Living people
20th-century sculptors
21st-century Spanish male artists